Big Zapper is a 1973 British action film directed by Lindsay Shonteff and starring Linda Marlowe, Gary Hope and Sean Hewitt. It was followed by a sequel The Swordsman.

Cast
 Linda Marlowe as Harriet Zapper
 Gary Hope as Kono
 Sean Hewitt as Fingers
 Michael O'Malley as Strawberry Jim
 Richard Monette as Rock Hard
 Jack May as Jeremiah Horn
 Penny Irving as Maggie
 Stuart Lock as Septimus / Randy Horn
 Bobbi Anne as Pandora Horn / Pandy
 Kristopher Kum as Samurai
 Hock Chuan as Samurai
 Tony Hiew as Samurai
 William Ridoutt as Shawn Cobra
 Graham Ashley as Cortini

References

Bibliography
 Denis Gifford. British Film Catalogue, Volume I. Routledge, 2016.
 Simon Sheridan. Keeping the British End Up: Four Decades of Saucy Cinema. Reynolds & Hearn Books, 2007.

External links

1973 films
British action films
1973 action films
1970s English-language films
Films directed by Lindsay Shonteff
1970s British films